Madhuca montana is a tree in the family Sapotaceae. The specific epithet montana means "of the mountains", referring to its habitat.

Description
The twigs are brownish. Inflorescences bear up to three flowers.

Distribution and habitat
Madhuca montana is endemic to Borneo. Its habitat is montane forests from  altitude.

Conservation
Madhuca montana has been assessed as endangered on the IUCN Red List. The species is threatened by logging and conversion of land for palm oil plantations.

References

montana
Endemic flora of Borneo
Trees of Borneo
Plants described in 1960